Denise McGregor (1966–78) was an Australian schoolgirl from Pascoe Vale, a suburb of Melbourne, Australia. She was kidnapped, raped and murdered on 20 March 1978. McGregor's assailant was never identified, and the case remains one of Melbourne's most infamous cold cases.

Abduction and aftermath
Denise was abducted as she was returning home from running errands to a local milk bar at the corner of Westgate and Anderson streets, Pascoe Vale, around 7:30pm.

The brutality of the murder was such that a pathologist described her injuries as being like those suffered by plane crash victims. A police re-enactment that screened at the time was reported to the broadcasting authorities as being excessively graphic, but the police chief said that it was toned down from what had happened to McGregor.

Robert Arthur Selby Lowe, convicted of the murder of Sheree Beasley, was a suspect in the murders of Denise McGregor and Kylie Maybury, but DNA evidence did not show any connection.

See also
List of kidnappings
List of unsolved murders

References

1970s missing person cases
Deaths by person in Australia
Female murder victims
Incidents of violence against girls
Missing person cases in Australia
Rape in Australia
Unsolved murders in Australia